TV 2 (TV to) is a Danish government-owned broadcast and subscription television station in Denmark based in Odense, Funen.

History
Since 1949, Danmarks Radio had been the sole provider of television in Denmark. Wanting to end the monopoly, the Danish Parliament voted on 30 May 1986, to create TV2, as a second choice for public service television. Upon its establishment, it had first begun its experimental test transmissions, and then, two years later, it had therefore commenced its official broadcast on 1 October 1988, with its first program being Danish Symphony which is broadcast at 17:00, followed by the news at 19:30.

Subscription and overseas availability
From 1 November 2009, all Danish television broadcasting became digital with DVB-T and MPEG4 standard. At the time, TV 2 did not encrypt their main channel, but TV 2 ZULU, TV 2 CHARLIE, TV 2 FRI, TV 2 NEWS, TV 2 SPORT and TV 2 SPORT X are subscription-only channels.

Although the main channel had been broadcast terrestrially in the clear ever since the channel was launched, this ended on 11 January 2012 when it was encrypted and required with a monthly subscription charge of 12.50 Danish Kroner required to be paid, along with the purchase or rental of a decoder. Now it is a full subscription-based streaming platform.

In southernmost Sweden and northernmost Germany (where a Danish minority lives), this means significant difficulties for their viewers in Germany and Sweden, as subscribers need a Danish postal address for ordering a decoder card. However, the channel is still available in Sweden through subscription to pay-TV services such as Com Hem and Telia. Also a special agreement between TV 2 and Kabel Deutschland has been made, that it is now available digitally in the cable television network of Vodafone Kabel Deutschland in northernmost Germany since 15 December 2011 and to keep it unencrypted there. The analogue transmission of TV 2 in the aforementioned German cable network ceased 31 January 2012 in the specific regions where it had been available before and was replaced with a German channel.

It is also available through pay-TV subscription in Norway through Canal Digital, Viasat, and Get.

Regions

Programming

On weekdays, TV 2 starts with Go'morgen Danmark (Literally: Good Morning Denmark), Denmark's only breakfast talk show on national TV.

At 11:00 they hand over to the regions who broadcast to 12:30 (with an interruption for national news). That is followed by TV 2's afternoon programming that mostly consists of American drama series and sitcoms. The regional stations also broadcast bulletins in the afternoon and evening, as well as a longer newscast at 19:30.

TV 2's main national newscasts are shown at 19:00 and 21:30 but bulletins in the morning (first newscast at 6:00), at 12:00, 17:00 and 18:00 have been added over the years.

In common with other TV channels in Denmark, most foreign programmes on TV 2, as well as interviews originally conducted in a foreign language (e.g. for news and current affairs programming), are shown in their original language with Danish subtitles, the exception being animated series aimed at children which are dubbed.

Funding
Historically TV 2 was funded by television license fees and advertising sales. However, although the regional channels are still partly funded this way, funding by television license for the main channel ended in July 2004.

This form of double financing, along with a large injection of capital (to cover a deficit of 1 billion DKK (€134 million)) from the Danish State, is currently under investigation by the EU; accusations being that the dual funding has constituted illegal state aid.

See also
List of Danish television channels

References

External links 

Official Site
TV 2 Zulu
TV 2 Charlie
TV 2 Play
TV 2 News

Television stations in Denmark
Television in Denmark
Television channels and stations established in 1986
Television channels and stations established in 1988
European Broadcasting Union members
Public corporations of the Danish Government
Mass media in Odense
1988 establishments in Denmark
Danish companies established in 1986
Danish companies established in 1988